Barra Funda is a district in the subprefecture of Lapa in the city of São Paulo, Brazil.

References

Districts of São Paulo